The Juno Award for Adult Contemporary Album of the Year is an annual award presented by the Canadian Academy of Recording Arts and Sciences (CARAS) for the best adult contemporary album released in Canada. It was first awarded at the 42nd Juno Awards ceremonies in 2013. The five nominees in the category are chosen by a panel of judges selected from the Canadian music industry and the winner is chosen by CARAS members.

Recipients

References

Adult contemporary album
Album awards